Nurin may refer to:
Nurin, Iran, a village in Zanjan Province, Iran
Nurin, Markazi, a village in Markazi Province, Iran
Nurin Industrial Complex, in Zanjan Province, Iran
Murder of Nurin Jazlin
Nurin an 2003 Swedish-Chinese Film Starring Dolph Lundgren